Hottegagi Genu Battegagi is a 2018 Indian Kannada language drama film written and directed by Narendra Babu. Produced by Sudarshan G, Ramamurthy H R and Harish Sherigar, film's music is scored by Ramchandra Hadapad. This movie is influenced by a 2015 Hollywood movie, The Intern, starring Robert De Niro and Anne Hathaway.  Anant Nag, Radhika Chetan, Gitanjali Rai feature in main roles. P K H Das is the cinematographer of the film, under the banner of ACME Movies International.

Cast
 Anant Nag as Shyam Prasad
 Radhika Chetan as Shravya
 Gitanjali Rai Gitanjali Rai
 Harish Sherigar
 Rakesh (rocko) as Mohith

Production 
The title for the film, which is a proverb in the Kannada language, was suggested by Anant Nag, who was cast to play the lead role in the film. The director Narendra Babu revealed that a title Kallu Sakkare Koliro was titled before Nag recommended Hottegagi Genu Battegagi after reading the film's script. Babu added that the difference in ideas between two generations was set as the theme of the film, portrayed by an ageing man employed at a corporate company and his young female boss.

Soundtrack

Ramachandra Hadpad composed the score and songs for the film. The soundtrack album was released in December 2017.

References

External links

2018 films
2010s Kannada-language films
Indian drama films